Helen E. Augur (died 1969) was an American journalist and historical writer. Augur  was born in Albert Lea, Minnesota and graduated from Barnard College in 1916. She became a journalist in Chicago, leaving for a while after the war  to become a correspondent for the Chicago Tribune in Russia. She began writing for McCall's in 1932. In 1937 Augur had a "torrid, though short-lived love affair" with her second cousin, Edmund Wilson.

Augur wrote several books, including Zapotec.

She died from lung cancer in Santa Monica, California, on September 15, 1969, and was buried in Lowville, New York.

Works
 (tr.) Religious Conversion: A Bio-Psychological Study by Sante De Sanctis. London & New York, 1927. The International Library of Psychology, Philosophy and Scientific Method.
 An American Jezebel: The Life of Anne Hutchinson, 1930
 The Book of Fairs, 1939
 Passage to Glory: John Ledyard's America, 1946
 Tall Ships to Cathay, 1951
 Zapotec, 1954
 The Secret War of Independence, 1955

References

External links
 

1969 deaths
American women journalists
American women historians
People from Albert Lea, Minnesota
20th-century American historians
Historians from Minnesota
Journalists from Minnesota
20th-century American journalists
20th-century American women writers
Barnard College alumni